TFDC may refer to:

Test Flight and Development Centre, a unit of the South African Air Force
TACO Faurecia Design Center Pvt. Ltd., an engineering joint venture between Faurecia and Tata AutoComp Systems Limited (TACO)